Hymenodictyeae is a tribe of flowering plants in the family Rubiaceae and contains about 25 species in two genera. The representatives of the genus Hymenodictyon are found in tropical and southern Africa, Madagascar, to tropical Asia and China (Yunnan). The two species of Paracorynanthe are restricted to Madagascar.

Genera
Currently accepted names:

 Hymenodictyon Wall. (23 spp.)
 Paracorynanthe Capuron (2 spp.)

Synonyms:

 Benteca Adans. = Hymenodictyon
 Kurria Hochst. & Steud. = Hymenodictyon

References

External links
 
 

 
Cinchonoideae tribes